Post-test odds may refer to:
 Bayes' theorem in terms of odds and likelihood ratio
 Post test odds as related to pre- and post-test probability